Mount Helen may refer to:

 Mount Helen (British Columbia) in British Columbia, Canada
 Mount Helen (Montana) in Montana, USA
 Mount Helen (Wyoming) in Wyoming, USA
 Mount Helen, Victoria in Ballarat, Australia